Giovan Battista Foppa, C.R. (1603–1673) was a Roman Catholic prelate who served as Archbishop of Benevento (1643–1673).

Biography
Giovan Battista Foppa was born in Bergamo, Italy in 1603 and ordained a priest in the Congregation of Clerics Regular of the Divine Providence on 14 Sep 1622.
On 18 May 1643, he was appointed during the papacy of Pope Urban VIII as Archbishop of Benevento.
On 25 May 1643, he was consecrated bishop by Vincenzo Maculani, Cardinal-Priest of San Clemente, with Giovanni Battista Altieri (seniore), Bishop Emeritus of Camerino, and Cesare Facchinetti, Bishop of Senigallia, serving as co-consecrators. 
He served as Archbishop of Benevento until his death on 16 Dec 1673.

Episcopal succession
While bishop, he was the principal co-consecrator of:

References

External links and additional sources
 (for Chronology of Bishops) 
 (for Chronology of Bishops) 

17th-century Italian Roman Catholic archbishops
Bishops appointed by Pope Urban VIII
1603 births
1673 deaths
Theatine bishops